

Champions 

 National Association: Boston

National Association final standings

Statistical leaders

Notable seasons 
Boston Red Stockings pitcher Al Spalding has a record of 38-8 in 404.2 innings pitched and leads the NA in wins. He has a 1.85 earned run average and a 196 ERA+. At the plate, Spalding has a batting average of .354 and an OPS+ of 144.
Boston Red Stockings second baseman Ross Barnes, in 45 games played, leads the NA with 99 hits, a .430 batting average, a 1.034 OPS, and a 211 OPS+. He has 81 runs scored and 44 runs batted in.

Events

January–March 

 March 4 – At its annual convention being held in Cleveland, the NA adopts a rule change to allow the use of the wrist in the pitching delivery.

April–June 

 April 22 – Candy Cummings makes his debut with Mutual of New York.
 April 26 – "Orator" Jim O'Rourke makes his debut with the Mansfield club of Middletown.
 May 24 – The Olympic Club of Washington play their last game before dropping out of the NA.  Poor talent and financial difficulties combine to do in the Olympics.
 May 29 – Despite not having a team in the league in 1872, the city of Chicago hosts its first NA game since the Great Chicago Fire as Lord Baltimore defeats Forest City in front of 4,000 fans.
 June 26 – The National B.B.C. of Washington, with an 0–11 record, disbands after losing 9–1 to Lord Baltimore.

July–September 

 July 6 – Sporting a 22–1 record, Harry Wright takes the Boston club on vacation to an island in Boston Harbor.
 July 9 – Eckford of Brooklyn commit 13 errors in their 15–3 loss to Union of Troy.  It is the fewest errors committed by the 0–11 Eckfords in a game thus far this season.
 July 23 – Despite a winning record, the Union Club of Troy disbands due to financial problems.  Half of the "Haymakers'" roster will move to Eckford of Brooklyn, which saves them from dropping out of the NA.
 July 26 – In an emergency meeting, the NA revises their scheduling requirements from 5 to 9 games versus each opponent competing for the championship.  This is in response to the number of teams that have disbanded and comes 3 days after the first-division Union of Troy had called it quits.
 August 13 – The Mansfield Club of Middletown, CT announce that they have disbanded and drop out of the NA.
 August 19 – Forest City of Cleveland disband the club after a loss to Boston.  This drops the number of teams still playing in the NA to 6.
 September 1 – Al Thake, left-fielder batting .295 for Atlantic, drowns in New York harbor after falling from a fishing boat. Thake is the first active major league ballplayer to die. (But Elmer White, active in 1871, had died in winter.)

October–December 

 October 22 – The Boston Red Stockings clinch the pennant with a 4–3 win over the Brooklyn Eckfords.

Births 
 January 12 – Togie Pittinger
 February 3 – Lou Criger
 March 3 – Willie Keeler
 March 24 – Kip Selbach
 May [?] – John Wood
 May 10 – Klondike Douglass
 May 16 – John O'Connell
 May 23 – Deacon Phillippe
 June 14 – Doc Parker
 August 6 – Sam Mertes
 August 15 – Silk O'Loughlin
 August 15 – John Warner
 August 18 – Eddie Hickey
 September 5 – Al Orth
 September 18 – Lord Byron
 September 20 – Joe Berry
 September 25 – Fred Odwell
 October 3 – Fred Clarke
 October 6 – Jack Dunn
 December 5 – Pink Hawley
 December 9 – Cy Seymour
 December 25 – Ted Lewis

Deaths

References 
General
 Ryczek, William J. (1992). Blackguards and Red Stockings; A History of Baseball's National Association 1871–1875. Wallingford, Connecticut: Colebrook Press 
 Nemec, David (1997). The Great Encyclopedia of 19th-Century Major League Baseball. New York: Donald I. Fine Books 
Specific

External links 
 1872 season at Baseball-Reference.com
 Charlton's Baseball Chronology at BaseballLibrary.com
 Retrosheet.org